Joseph Gilbert Hamilton (November 11, 1907 – February 18, 1957) was an American professor of Medical Physics, Experimental Medicine, General Medicine, and Experimental Radiology as well as director (1948-1957) of the Crocker Laboratory, part of the Lawrence Berkeley National Laboratory. Hamilton studied the medical effects of exposure to radioactive isotopes, which included the use of unsuspecting human subjects.

He was married to painter Leah Hamilton.

Early work

Hamilton received his B.S. in Chemistry in 1929 from the University of California.  He studied medicine in Berkeley and interned at the University of California Hospital, San Francisco. He was awarded his M.D. degree in 1936. At that time the cyclotron in Berkeley was among the first to produce useful amounts of radioactive isotopes which could be used in studies of their effects on living tissue. In a series of papers published in 1937 Hamilton detailed early medical trials using radioactive sodium, followed by papers detailing the use of the radioactive isotopes of potassium, chlorine, bromine, and iodine. Radioactive iodine was found to be particularly useful in the diagnosis and treatment of thyroid disorders.

Human testing
Concern was expressed while working on the Manhattan Project in 1944, for the safety of laboratory personnel working with newly isolated plutonium. Hamilton lead a team who conducted toxicity experiments on rats. Finding the results obtained with rats unsatisfactory, Hamilton was included in the decision making to continue the trials with human subjects. These trials were conducted in secret from 1945 to 1947.

Trials were carried out by three teams headed by Hamilton, Louis Hempelmann and Wright Haskell Langham. They consisted of injecting plutonium into unsuspecting human patients then measuring its concentration in excreta. During these trials 18 human subjects were injected with Plutonium, three by Joseph Gilbert Hamilton's team at University of California Hospital, San Francisco.

Albert Stevens, CAL-1, had been diagnosed with terminal stomach cancer, which was later found to have been an ulcer. Stevens is significant as he is recorded as having survived the highest known accumulated radiation dose of any human. He lived 20 years after the injection until his death at 79 years of age.

Simeon Shaw, CAL-2, was 4 years old at the time of injection and had been diagnosed with bone cancer. Shaw lived for 255 days post injection, with his cause of death being recorded as from bone cancer.

Elmer Allen, CAL-3, was 36 at the time of injection and lived for 44 years post injection, with his cause of death being recorded as respiratory failure, pneumonia. He died in 1991 shortly before Eileen Welsome could interview Allen for her work in exposing the trials.

Hamilton's studies of isotope retention in humans, especially of radioactive strontium and the transuranic elements, were the principal source for the U.S. Atomic Energy Commission setting of far lower tolerance limits of these substances than had been theorised before trials. This series of human trials were terminated by the Atomic Energy Commission in 1950.

The "Buchenwald touch" memo
Once the AEC took over control of the Manhattan Project's various roles, Hamilton returned to his work at Berkeley. In a memo written in 1950, Hamilton gave some recommendations to the AEC's Director of Biology and Medicine, Shields Warren. Hamilton wrote that large primates like "chimpanzees ... [should] be substituted for humans in the planned studies on radiation's cognitive effects." He further warned that by using humans the AEC would be open "to considerable criticism," since the experiments as proposed had "a little of the Buchenwald touch." Eugene Saenger would be the one who carried out these experiments from 1960 to 1971 at the University of Cincinnati, exposing "at least 90 cancer patients to large radiation doses."

Death and legacy 

Hamilton died at the age of 49. His name was added to the Monument to the X-ray and Radium Martyrs of All Nations erected in Hamburg, Germany.

Notes

References
 Moss, William & Eckhardt, Roger (1995) The Human Plutonium Injection Experiments, Los Alamos Science 23, 177-233;  
 Welsome, Eileen (1999) The plutonium files: America's Secret Medical Experiments in the Cold War Dial press, New York.  ;

External links
"In Memoriam: Joseph Gilbert Hamilton" University of California 1959;
;
;

1907 births
1957 deaths
American medical researchers
Manhattan Project people
American radiologists
Radiobiology
Radiation health effects researchers
University of California, Berkeley alumni
University of California, Berkeley staff
American nuclear medicine physicians
Medical physicists